The Kansas City Monarchs were the longest-running franchise in the history of baseball's Negro leagues. Operating in Kansas City, Missouri, and owned by J. L. Wilkinson, they were charter members of the Negro National League from 1920 to 1930. J. L. Wilkinson was the first Caucasian owner at the time of the establishment of the team. In 1930, the Monarchs became the first professional baseball team to use a portable lighting system which was transported from game to game in trucks to play games at night, five years before any major league team did. The Monarchs won ten league championships before integration, and triumphed in the first Negro League World Series in 1924. The Monarchs had only one season in which they did not have a winning record. The team produced more major league players than any other Negro league franchise. It was  disbanded in 1965.

Negro National League
The Monarchs were formed in 1920, primarily from two sources.  Owner J. L. Wilkinson drew players from his All Nations barnstorming team, which had been inactive during World War I, and the 25th Infantry Wreckers, an all-black team recruited into the U.S. Army almost exclusively for their playing talent.  He put together a collection of talent, including pitcher/outfielder Bullet Rogan, an eventual Hall of Famer who established himself as one of the most popular stars of the new league; sluggers Dobie Moore, Heavy Johnson, George Carr, and Hurley McNair; and pitchers Rube Currie and Cliff Bell. Immediate contenders, the Monarchs became bitter rivals to black baseball's reigning power, Rube Foster's Chicago American Giants.  After three years of failing to break off the Giants' hold on the pennant, Wilkinson fired manager Sam Crawford in mid-1923, replacing him with veteran Cuban star José Méndez, who then led the Monarchs to the league championship.

Winning the pennant again in 1924, the Monarchs participated in the first Negro League World Series, defeating the Eastern Colored League champion Hilldale team from Darby, Pennsylvania, in a ten-game series (five wins, four losses, and one tie).  In this series, Méndez had an ERA of 1.42 in four of the games and was responsible for a shutout in the one game he was the starting pitcher in. Motivated by the Monarchs' runaway pennant victory, NNL president Rube Foster changed the league schedule to a split-season format for 1925. However, Kansas City still took the league title again in 1925, but lost the World Series to Hilldale when Rogan was injured just before the series began, winning one game and losing five.  Even though Méndez was the manager, he still pitched during the few years he held the position. Among the team's regulars during these years were the second baseman/shortstop Newt Allen who in the 1924 series alone had an average of .282 and seven doubles  and Frank Duncan. Newt Joseph played third base for the Monarchs from 1922 through their NNL years, hitting a composite .284 during that time.

In 1926 manager Méndez returned to Cuba, and Rogan took over as player/manager.  He kept up the Monarchs' tradition of fine pitching, as the team's staff over the next few years featured Negro league greats including Chet Brewer, William Bell, and lefty Andy Cooper. The club traded for legendary Cuban outfielder Cristóbal Torriente, but also permanently lost the services of star shortstop Dobie Moore, whose career ended that year due to a severe off-the-field injury. After winning the first-half pennant, the Monarchs dropped a best of nine playoff to the Chicago American Giants when Rogan lost both games of a series-closing doubleheader to the young Bill Foster, another eventual Hall of Famer.  In 1928 the Monarchs narrowly missed a second-half title, but won both halves of the 1929 NNL title with the best overall single-season record ever compiled by a Negro league team at 62 wins and 17 losses.  By this time, pitcher Andy Cooper who had made a name for himself by playing for seven years with the Detroit Stars had joined the Monarchs. No World Series was played that year between the Monarchs and the Baltimore Black Sox, champions of the eastern American Negro League.

Barnstorming, Negro American League
Following the death of the original league, the Monarchs spent several years as an independent team, mostly barnstorming through the Midwest, West, and western Canada.  They frequently toured with the House of David baseball team. Hall of Famers Hilton Smith, a pitcher, and Willard Brown, a slugging shortstop/outfielder with a consistent batting average of over .300, became Monarch mainstays during this time.  During the 1940s, Willard Brown became the go-to home run hitter for the Monarchs.  With Andy Cooper now at the helm, the Monarchs became charter members of the Negro American League in 1937, winning the first league title.  Andy Cooper was responsible for leading the Monarchs to bring home the pennant in 1939 and 1940.  The Kansas City Monarchs then won the next two league championships and won  winning the renewed Negro League World Series in 1942 in four straight games against the Homestead Grays.

At the start of this run the Monarchs acquired their most famous player, Hall of Fame pitcher Satchel Paige, who had since his rookie season in 1927 built a reputation as the best hurler in black baseball for the Birmingham Black Barons, Pittsburgh Crawfords, and several other teams. Suffering from an arm injury and generally thought to be done, Paige joined the Monarchs' B team in 1939; by 1940 he had recovered and been called up to the Monarchs' main squad, where he became their top drawing card.  Paige was the subject of a lot of stories, both true and folklore, and became a legend to people who don’t even follow baseball.  For example, he was known to have known the outfielders to sit on the ground behind him while he struck out the hitter and there was someone on base that could possibly tie the game up.  Paige also warmed up before pitching in a game by throwing across a gum wrapper as home plate.  Paige led another superb Monarchs' staff that included fellow Hall of Famer Hilton Smith, the veteran Chet Brewer, Booker McDaniels, Jim LaMarque, and several others.  They won one last NAL pennant in 1946, but lost a seven-game World Series to the Newark Eagles; in this series, they lost four games and won three.

In 1945, UCLA football star and Army lieutenant Jackie Robinson hit .387 as the Monarchs' shortstop.  He became the first Monarch to make the jump to white baseball, signing with the Brooklyn Dodgers in 1946.  He broke the minor league color line in 1946 with the Montreal Royals, and integrated the major leagues with the Dodgers in 1947.  As baseball gradually desegregated in the late 1940s and 1950s, the Monarchs developed a niche as the foremost developer of black talent for the major leagues.  The team sent more players to the majors than any other Negro league franchise, including Robinson, Paige, Ernie Banks, Elston Howard, Hank Thompson, and Willard Brown.

Newt Allen succeeded Cooper as manager in 1941, and was followed by Frank Duncan in 1942.  Duncan stayed at the helm through the 1947 season winning two league titles and one world title.  After Duncan stepped down, longtime first baseman Buck O'Neil took over. Then Monarchs lost the league title to the Birmingham Black Barons in 1948 which prevented them from appearing in the last Negro World Series. 1948 was also the year that Wilkinson sold the Monarchs to Tom Baird who owned the team through their minor league days in the 1950s.  The Monarchs won the league's western division first-half pennant in 1949, but declined to participate in a playoff with the Chicago American Giants, as their roster was depleted by player sales to major league clubs.  They won the NAL West Division title in 1950 but did not meet the eastern champion Indianapolis Clowns that year.  They won a half-season pennant in 1951 but lost a playoff.  O'Neil won his only two league titles in 1953 and 1955, with a last-place finish sandwiched between in 1954 as the Negro American League of the 1950s declined in quality and shrank in size, while in the process grooming a number of eventual major league players.

Home fields and move to Grand Rapids 
The Monarchs played their home games in the minor league Kansas City Blues' Association Park from 1920 to 1923, and moved to the Blues' new park, Muehlebach Field, in mid-1923. They mostly barnstormed in the early-to-mid-1930s, but used Muehlebach (later known as Ruppert Stadium or Blues Stadium at different times) from 1937 until 1955.  After a single season of scheduling games with the major league Kansas City Athletics as prime tenants of the renamed Municipal Stadium, Tom Baird sold eight players to major league clubs and four more players to minor league teams, released his manager, Buck O'Neil, who then signed on as a scout for the Chicago Cubs, and then sold the franchise to baseball entrepreneur Ted Rasberry, who moved its base to Grand Rapids, Michigan, though retaining the name "Kansas City Monarchs".  From 1956 on, the Monarchs were a full-time barnstorming team.  The Negro American League ceased operations in 1962, and the Monarchs finally disbanded after the 1965 season.  In Grand Rapids, the Monarchs Played at Valley Field, located at 700 Valley Ave NW, 49584.

Minor league affiliate 
The Kansas City Monarchs were one of a few Negro league teams that informally employed a farm team.  The Monroe Monarchs played from the late 1920s to 1935, mostly as a minor league team loosely associated with Kansas City.

Baseball Hall of Famers
Players and managers listed in bold are depicted on their Hall of Fame plaques wearing a Monarchs cap insignia.  An asterisk (*) denotes the player is depicted on Hall of Fame plaque without a cap insignia or with the cap insignia obscured but the Hall of Fame recognizes Monarchs as "Primary Team"

Other star players 
 Newt Allen (1922–1930, 1934, 1941)
 Gene Baker (1948) MLB All-Star
 Elston Howard (1948–1950) 12 x MLB All-Star; 1963 AL Most Valuable Player
 Connie Johnson (1941–1942, 1946–1948, 1950)
Buck O'Neil (1938–1943, 1946–1955)
 Bartolo Portuondo (1920–1922)
 Hank Thompson (1943, 1946–1948)
 Quincy Trouppe (1932, 1935)

Legacy
In February 2021, the team's name was revived by a Kansas City, Kansas, minor league team, the Kansas City T-Bones. The name was approved through a negotiation with the Negro Leagues Baseball Museum.

MLB throwback jerseys
The Kansas City Royals have honored the Monarchs by wearing replica uniforms during regular-season baseball games on several occasions, including July 14, 2001 (at Pittsburgh), July 1, 2007, and May 30, 2009 (at home vs. White Sox), June 9, 2012 (at Pittsburgh), July 21, 2012, and June 23, 2019 (both at home vs. Minnesota), August 24, 2013 (at home vs. Washington Nationals), May 18, 2014 (at home vs. Baltimore), May 17, 2015 (at home vs. New York Yankees), May 15, 2016 (at home vs. Atlanta), May 7, 2017 (at home vs. Cleveland), and August 13, 2022 (at home vs. Los Angeles Dodgers). Throwback jerseys worn during Royals home games have typically been auctioned as a fundraiser for the Negro Leagues Baseball Museum.

See also 
:Category:Kansas City Monarchs players - full list of Monarch players
Kansas City Monarchs (2021–present) - Independent baseball team that adopted the team's name, originally known as the Kansas City T-Bones

References

Additional references
Only the Ball was White by Robert Peterson (1970) Publisher: Prentice-Hall (Englewood Cliffs NJ) 
The Kansas City Monarchs by Janet Bruce-Campbell {1985} Publisher: University Press of Kansas (Lawrence KS) 
The Monarchs 1920–1938, Featuring Wilber "Bullet" Rogan by Phil S. Dixon {2002} Publisher: Mariah Press (Sioux Falls SD) 
The Negro Leagues Book edited by Dick Clark & Larry Lester {1994} Publisher: The Society for American Baseball Research (Cleveland OH) 
The Complete Book of Baseball's Negro Leagues by John B. Holway {2001} Publisher: Hastings House 
Black America Series Black Baseball in Kansas Cityby Larry Lester and Sammy J. Miller (2000) Publisher: Arcadia Publishing (Charleston, SC)

External links
 Franchise history at Seamheads.com
 1920 Kansas City Monarchs Calendar

 
African-American history of Missouri
Kansas City Monarchs
Jackie Robinson
Sports in the Kansas City metropolitan area
Sports in Grand Rapids, Michigan
Defunct baseball teams in Missouri
Professional baseball teams in Missouri
Sports teams in Kansas City, Missouri
Kansas City, Missouri
Baseball teams disestablished in 1965
Baseball teams established in 1920